The 114th Fighter Escadrille of the Polish Air Force (Polish: 114. Eskadra Myśliwska) was one of the fighter units of the Polish Army at the beginning of the WW2.

Crew and equipment 
On 1 September 1939 the escadrille had 10 planes: 6 PZL P.11c and 4 PZL P.11a. 
The commanding officer was kpt. pil. Juliusz Frey and his deputy was Jerzy Szałowski

pilots:

 ppor. Marian Szalewicz
 ppor. Stanisław Szmejl
 ppor. Tadeusz Szumowski
 pchor. Bogusław Mierzwa
 pchor. Włodzimierz Miksa
 pchor. Roman Stoga
 pchor. Zbigniew Wróblewski
 plut. Władysław Kiedrzyński
 kpr. Czesław Bielecki
 kpr. Andrzej Niewiara
 st. szer. Benedykt Dąbrowski
 st. szer. Józef Kędziora
 st. szer. Bolesław Olewiński
 st. szer. Jerzy Zieliński
Tadeusz Sawicz, from 5 September as the deputy commander

See also
Polish Air Force order of battle in 1939

References
 

Polish Air Force escadrilles